Ron Harris (1933 – May 26, 2017) was an American erotic photographer and television director.

Harris was born in Brooklyn, and attended High School of Performing Arts.

In 1980, Aerobicise began with a four-minute pilot featuring Harris’ then girlfriend, Jami Allen, later associate producer and voice-over of Aerobicise.

In 1981, Harris created and directed the first erotic exercise show, Aerobicise on Showtime on cable television. Aerobicise was nominated for a CableACE Award and became the highest grossing exercise video series of its time. He later created :20 Minute Workout.

Jane Leeves, Jami Allen, Loryanna Catalano, Deborah Corday, Tina Rocca, Tamarah Park, Beth Farrelly, Amanda Lee, Debbie Bellman, Evangeline Browne, Darcy DeMoss, Lee Nicholl, Dan Peterson, Adria Wilson, and others performed in various episodes.

Library Of Congress Copyright Collection has 55 Showtime episodes.

In 1983, Harris, who had three children by four marriages, lived in Westwood, California, with daughter Tiffany, 10.

In 1985, Harris wrote the book Aerobicise 20 minutes a day published and distributed by Simon & Schuster in 1986.

The Aerobicise series was released by Paramount Home Video between 1982 and 1995 and was available in LaserDisc, CED, VHS, and DVD formats.

In 1996, Harris launched RonHarris.com, an adult-oriented website featuring models between the ages of 18 and 24. In 1999, Harris introduced a website ronsangels.com that, according to the BBC, offered  "the eggs of eight models for auction over the internet" with bids starting "between US$15,000 and US$150,000, depending on the model". Harris describes his idea as, "Darwin's natural selection at its very best". Critics have stated that this equates to profit-based eugenics. The egg auctioning part of site was a hoax.

In 2013, American Apparel teamed with Harris to create a tumblr.

References

External links
 Official Website
 Ron Harris  IMDb
 https://www.discogs.com/artist/2324787-Ron-Harris-8

1933 births
2017 deaths
American erotic photographers
American television producers
American sex industry businesspeople